Danimer Scientific,  formerly known as Meredian Holdings Group Inc. and MHG, is a biopolymer manufacturer headquartered in Bainbridge, Georgia.

Danimer Scientific owns the patent for Nodax medium-chain-length branched polyhydroxyalkanoates, mcl-PHA. The company uses PHA and other biopolymers to create a range of applications such as additives, aqueous coatings, extrusion coating, extrusion lamination, fibers, film resins, hot melt adhesives, injection molding, thermoforming and wax replacement polymers. In addition, Danimer Scientific offers research and development in the formulation of biopolymers. Danimer Scientific also provides toll manufacturing and compounding services, allowing partners to use the Bainbridge facility to manufacture products.

Background

DaniMer Scientific 

DaniMer Scientific was formed in 2004 to create biodegradable and sustainable solutions to the global dependency on traditional plastics, by using biopolymer materials such as polylactic acid (PLA). DaniMer Scientific specializes in customizing biopolymer formulations.

The company received the Sustainability Award from the Specialty Coffee Association of America (SCAA) in 2007 for the Ecotainer coffee cup, which used a plastic biopolymer derived from corn for the inner lining.

In 2006, the Small Business Innovation Research (SBIR) program awarded Danimer with a Phase 1 monetary grant of $80,000 for the "Creation of Cost Competitive Biodegradable Films from Renewable Resources for Agriculture". The following year the SBIR awarded the company with a Phase 2 monetary grant of $346,000 for the same title, stating that the project's objective was to use renewable materials to develop agricultural mulch films that could adequately degrade before the next growing season

In 2010, DaniMer Scientific received a contract for $846,828 from the organization, Research Partnership to Secure Energy for America (RPSEA) to develop an environmentally friendly fracturing treatment for hydrocarbon production, now known as SqueezeFrac.

In September 2011, Danimer Scientific and minority business enterprise, Sijo Global Partners, formed a strategic affiliation where Sijo would offer Danimer’s bioplastic products to market leaders and brand owners.

In January 2013, DaniMer and Henkel formed a partnership to further develop bio-based hot melt adhesives for polyethylene terephthalate (PET) container packaging that are made with 50% renewable content or higher.

Meredian Inc. 

Originally formed in 2004, Meredian Inc. manufactures PHA for Danimer Scientific. Danimer Scientific's Nodax PHA is a specialized, medium-chain-length branched polyhydroxyalkanoate, mcl-PHA.

Danimer and Meredian originally purchased Procter & Gamble’s intellectual property on PHA technology in 2007. In 2013, Dr. Isao Noda joined Danimer / Meredian Inc. after spending thirty years with Procter & Gamble.

In 2014, the company received a Food and Substance Contact Notification approval from the United States Food and Drug Association (FDA). The sole-verification guarantees that the biopolymers are safe to use for food contact and are classified as non-hazardous waste after disposal.

Previous Merger into Meredian Holdings Group, Inc. 

In February 2014, DaniMer Scientific and Meridian Inc. merged into MHG.
Championed by Dr. Paul Pereira who was CEO and Executive Chairman during the period from September 2013 until October 2015.

Corporate Identity Change to Danimer Scientific  
The company's name changed to Danimer Scientific was officially announced in October 2016.

Danimer Scientific PHA 

Danimer Scientific's PHA has received several certifications for biodegradability including: anaerobic and aerobic digestion in soil, freshwater, marine, industrial and home composting.

The patented version of Danimer Scientific's mcl-PHA is known as Nodax, and it is the primary product developed for commercial manufacturing. Danimer Scientific's Nodax PHA is a class of bioplastics produced from bacterial microorganisms that store PHA polyesters for energy in their cell walls. These microbes feed upon plant-based oils procured from non-food sources.

Microorganism & Fermentation 

Plant based oils are transferred to Danimer Scientific’s proprietary bio-reactors. There, the oil is fed to naturally regenerating, soil borne bacteria who produce PHA through biosynthesis.

Reactive Extrusion 

The reactive extrusion process mixes and compounds the bioplastic materials in a unique proprietary procedure that creates a customized biopolymer resin pellet.

Executive Team 
Stephen Croskrey, chief executive officer
Dr. Isao Noda, chief science officer and senior vice president of Innovation
 John A. Dowdy III, chief financial officer
 Michael Smith, chief operating officer
 Scott Tuten, chief marketing officer
 Phil Van Trump, chief technology officer

Affiliations 
 Henkel
 SOLO/DART

Certifications 
 Meredian received sole-verification from the FDA for food substance contact

References

External links
 
 Official blog
  on Facebook
  on Google+
  on Twitter

2004 establishments in Georgia (U.S. state)
Biotechnology companies of the United States
Companies listed on the New York Stock Exchange
Decatur County, Georgia
Holding companies established in 2004